CAFB may refer to:

 Canadian Association of Food Banks
 Castle Air Force Base, in California
 Columbus Air Force Base, in Mississippi
 C.A.F.B., influential Hungarian rock group